The April–May strikes (also known as the milk strike or mine strike) were labour strikes in 1943 in the Netherlands against forced labour during the Second World War.

Background 
The reason for this national strike was the announcement on 29 April 1943 that Dutch former soldiers who had fought in 1940 had to report to work in Germany for the Arbeitseinsatz. Because of the many German casualties during the battle of Stalingrad, extra manpower was needed to keep the German war industry going. Dutch people who refused to work in Germany could count on 'the strictest measures'.

Strike 
The strike started on Thursday 29 April 1943 at Machinefabriek Gebr. Stork & Co in Hengelo in Overijssel and spread rapidly throughout the Netherlands. Strike leader Jan Berend Vlam had managed to get out of Camp Sint-Michielsgestel where he had been prisoned for eight months. His resistance did not stop, immediately out of imprisonment he organized meetings in his home on the Krabbenbosweg in Hengelo which eventually led to the strikes.
In cooperation with Stork's telephone operator Femy Efftink, the strike became nationwide. She called with all her contacts as a telephone operator with the request to join in as well.  Gradually, the strike spread to companies in almost all of the provinces in the country. More than 500,000 people eventually laid off work.

A disappointment for the strikers was that the Dutch Railways continued to operate. It also stayed quiet in and around Rotterdam, The Hague and Amsterdam, where the bloody aftermath of the February strike of 1941 was still in people's memories. The strike ended on 3 May 1943.

This strike is also known as the Milk Strike, because farmers did not deliver milk to the factories and gave their milk away free of charge to the citizens or scatter it over the grasslands. In the Mining region of southern Limburg, the strike was called the Mining Strike and was supported by the Roman Catholic Church.

The strike was the largest in the Netherlands with a participation of 200,000 people. The strike has a lot of influence and is called a turning point in the German occupation. The occupier learned that the Dutch didn't succeed in becoming a National Socialist and the Dutch now saw the horror of the Germans, which gave the Resistance an enormous impulse.

Punishment 
The German occupiers reacted to the strike with a heavy hand. Eighty strikers were stand trial by execution, their names were announced on billboards. In addition, 95 people were killed and 400 seriously injured by fire by the occupying forces on the strikers. After and during the strike, two hundred people were killed as a result of summary executions and exhaustion in penal camps. Because of the role of the Stork factory, engineer Frederik Marinus Loep was sentenced to death. Loep was not present in Hengelo when the strikes started. He was executed on 4 May in Twickelse bossen. His body was never found.

Monuments 
Monument at the N.H. Church in Marum
Monument milk strike Lake Sua
Monument Appelbergen, Haren
War Memorial in Vaassen[6]
Monument at railway station Hengelo (Overijssel)

References

Nazi war crimes
Dutch resistance